The Minister of Agriculture was a member of the Executive Committee of the Privy Council of Northern Ireland (Cabinet) in the Parliament of Northern Ireland which governed Northern Ireland from 1921 to 1972.  The post was combined with that of the Minister of Commerce until 1925, and was later vacant for three short periods.

Parliamentary Secretary to the Ministry of Agriculture
1941 – 1943 Brian Maginess
1943 – 1956 vacant
1956 – 1958 John Bailey
1958 – 1960 Harry West
1960 – 1964 vacant
1964 – 1965 William Long

Office abolished 1965

References
The Government of Northern Ireland

1921 establishments in Northern Ireland
1972 disestablishments in Northern Ireland
Executive Committee of the Privy Council of Northern Ireland